'''Carmina Slovenica is a production house from Slovenia. Its concert and music theatre productions has toured internationally. Artistic director of Carmina Slovenica is a conductor and director-author Karmina Šilec.
The Carmina Slovenica vocal theatre has performed at the Tokyo Metropolitan Art Space, Grand St. Petersburg Philharmonic Hall, St. Ann's Warehouse NY, Esplanade Singapore, Teresa Carreño Theatre Caracas, Hong Kong Cultural Centre, Radial System Berlin, San Francisco Symphony Hall, Teatro Colón in Buenos Aires, Jahrhuderthalle Bochum, Théâtre de la Ville Paris, Auditorium Rome, the World Music Days, the Prototype Festival New York, the Festival d’Automne á Paris, the Moscow Easter Festival, the Dresden Musikfestspiele, Ruhrtriennale, the European Symposium on Choral Music, the Steirischer Herbst, the Holland Festival, the Polyfollia, the America Cantat, the Kunstenfestivaldesarts Brussels, the Europa Cantat, the Nuit de Choer Brussels, KunstFestSpiele, the Herrenhausen, Lublin Theatre Confrontation Festival, the Melbourne Festival, the International Festival and the Beijing Choir Olympics.

selected projects 

 Fortuna Won't Be Fauvel's Match
 Threnos (for the Throat) 
 Toxic Psalms
 Placebo
 Vampirabile
 Rusalki
 From Time Immemorial...
 Scivias
 Dert - endemic songs
 VOGP - music for survival
 Adiemus
 Na juriš in the mood!

major artistic programs 

 Choregie: Choregie series Coproduction of the international competition and new music theatre festival Choregie
 Ensembles: Carmina Slovenica Concert Choir, Ensemble ¡Kebataola!, Vocal Theatre Carmina Slovenica
 Attacca: Festival, international projects, concert cycle, residence programme, special social programs
 Publishing: 
books: Karmina Šilec: endemic songs, Melita Forstnerič Hajnšek: Planet Carmina, Karmina Šilec: Nolite tacere
CD'S: VOGP, DERT, Laude Cortonese, Toxic Psalms, Vampirabile, Laude Cortonese, Musica Inaudita, Na juriš in the mood!, Americas, Time and places, Balkanika, Slovenian sounds, Drum cafe and others 1 
LP: Na juriš in the mood!  
 DVD: Placebo, What do you have against peasants, Lady?, Threnos, Placebo
 Education: Choral School CS, Workshops, Seminars

selected awards
 Golden Mask 
 the Prešern Found Award
 Ford Award for preservation of natural and cultural heritage  
 First place at International competition Kalundborg at Denmark
 Most outstanding choir of competition "Kathaumixw 94"

References

External links
 http://www.carmina-slovenica.si/en/
 http://www.karminasilec.com

Slovenian music